Hrabar Nunatak (Nunatak Hrabar \'nu-na-tak 'hra-b&r\) is a 160m rocky peak on the north coast of Greenwich Island in the South Shetland Islands, Antarctica, and overlooking Yakoruda Glacier to the south.  The peak is "named after the Bulgarian scholar Chernorizets Hrabar (9th Century AD).".

Location

Maps
 L.L. Ivanov et al. Antarctica: Livingston Island and Greenwich Island, South Shetland Islands. Scale 1:100000 topographic map. Sofia: Antarctic Place-names Commission of Bulgaria, 2005.
 L.L. Ivanov. Antarctica: Livingston Island and Greenwich, Robert, Snow and Smith Islands. Scale 1:120000 topographic map.  Troyan: Manfred Wörner Foundation, 2009.

Notes

References
 Hrabar Nunatak. SCAR Composite Antarctic Gazetteer
 Bulgarian Antarctic Gazetteer. Antarctic Place-names Commission. (details in Bulgarian, basic data in English)

External links
 Hrabar Nunatak. Copernix satellite image

Nunataks of Greenwich Island